Crew Dragon Resilience (Dragon C207) is a Crew Dragon spacecraft manufactured by SpaceX and built under NASA's Commercial Crew Program. In November 2020, it was launched into orbit to the International Space Station as part of the Crew-1 mission. With crew prompting, Resilience docked autonomously to the station at 04:01 UTC on 17 November 2020, or Day 2 of the mission, marking the first operational docking of a Crew Dragon and the first operational docking of the Commercial Crew Program. The mission carried four additional members of Expedition 64 to the three already on station.

Resilience returned to Earth at the end of the Crew-1 mission on 2 May 2021, and soon after began refurbishment ahead of its next assignment, the Inspiration4 mission  which launched on 16 September 2021.

History 

Originally planned to fly the mission after Crew-1, Crew Dragon C207 was reassigned to fly Crew-1 after an anomaly during a static fire test destroyed capsule C204 intended to be re-flown on the Crew Dragon In-Flight Abort Test. The spacecraft C205 intended to be used on the Demo-2 mission replaced the destroyed spacecraft for the in-flight abort test. C206 intended for use with the Crew-1 mission, was reassigned to the Demo-2 mission.

On 1 May 2020, SpaceX said that spacecraft C207 was in production and astronaut training underway. Crew Dragon C207 arrived at SpaceX processing facilities in Florida on 18 August 2020.

At a NASA press conference on 29 September 2020, commander Michael Hopkins revealed that C207 had been named Resilience. The trunk was attached and secured to the capsule on 2 October 2020 at Cape Canaveral.

Resilience was first launched on 16 November 2020 (UTC) on a Falcon 9 from the Kennedy Space Center (KSC), LC-39A, carrying NASA astronauts Michael Hopkins, Victor Glover, and Shannon Walker, and JAXA astronaut Soichi Noguchi on a six-month mission to the International Space Station.

The docking adapter, normally used to dock with the International Space Station, was replaced by a domed glass window for the Inspiration4 mission. This allows for 360-degree views of space and the Earth, similar to those provided by the Cupola Module on the ISS.

Flights

See also 

 Boeing Starliner

Notes

References

External links 
 

SpaceX Dragon 2
Individual space vehicles
NASA spacecraft
Crewed spacecraft